Moundville Township is a township in Vernon County, in the U.S. state of Missouri.

Moundville Township was erected in 1867, taking its name from the community of Moundville, Missouri.

References

Townships in Missouri
Townships in Vernon County, Missouri